Dubravica is a village in the municipality of Požarevac, Serbia.
 
According to the 2002 census, the village has a population of 1,225 people.

Near the village, at the locality known as Orašje, are situated remains of late Roman and early medieval fortified town of Margum Dubravica, presumed location of the ancient city and former Diocese of Margum (although others situate it at another Orašje in present Bosnia and Herzegovina).

See also
Populated places in Serbia

References 

Populated places in Braničevo District